Parmacella deshayesi is a species of air-breathing land snail, a terrestrial pulmonate gastropod mollusk in the family Parmacellidae.

Distribution 
Distribution of this species include:
 Algeria
 Morocco
 It could also occur in the Iberian Peninsula.

Description 
The animal is evenly brown, in the young animals sometimes with blackish streaks or spots. The mantle length is 55% of body. The size of preserved specimen is up to 60 mm.

The shell is thin-walled, delicate. The apex is completely smooth, yellow.

References
This article incorporates public domain text from the reference.

Links
 Biodiversity Heritage Library - Bourguignat 1864, 1-20 - FREE IMAGES

Parmacellidae
Gastropods described in 1848